Liu Fengqi (born 27 February 1999) is a Chinese Paralympic swimmer. He won the bronze medal in the men's 100 metre backstroke S8 event at the 2020 Summer Paralympics in Tokyo, Japan.

References

External links
 

Living people
1999 births
Chinese male backstroke swimmers
Swimmers at the 2020 Summer Paralympics
Paralympic bronze medalists for China
Paralympic medalists in swimming
Paralympic swimmers of China
Medalists at the 2020 Summer Paralympics
Place of birth missing (living people)
S8-classified Paralympic swimmers
21st-century Chinese people